Michael Magee (1929–2011) was a Canadian actor and author.

Michael or Mike Magee may also refer to:

 Mike Magee (journalist) (born 1949), British journalist
 Mike Magee (soccer) (born 1984), American Major League Soccer player
 Michael Magee, Irish casualty during the Battle at Springmartin

See also
Michael McGee (disambiguation)